Loner is the third studio album by Australian DJ and producer Alison Wonderland, released on 6 May 2022 through EMI Music Australia. It follows four years after her previous album Awake, and was preceded by the singles "Bad Things", "Fuck U Love U", "Fear of Dying", "New Day" and "Forever". She will tour North America in support of the record.

Background
After years of touring, Wonderland said that the COVID-19 pandemic halting events around the world in 2020 left her feeling "entirely alone" and as if she "had hit [her] rock bottom". She eventually returned to recording music as a "way to move forward", taking inspiration from her previous albums to "work out where she's going" and to no longer "be the victim" in the stories she tells. Wonderland called Loner a "rebirth" as well as her "most positive album" and hoped that the album would "empower" listeners to "feel less alone".

Wonderland initially announced a new album at the end of 2021.

Themes
EDM.com called the use of blindfolds on the cover and in the singles' music videos "a motif for vulnerability and detachment".

Critical reception

Nicole Otero of Gigwise complimented Loners "intricate sounds and disarming and raw feelings supporting wickedly clever lyrics" as well as its blend of "emotional content" and "anthemic drops", calling it Wonderland's "best album to date" and writing that it will "inspire her fans to look ahead to a better tomorrow".

Track listing

Charts

References

2022 albums
Alison Wonderland albums
EMI Music Australia albums